Saheb Divan (also Romanized as Şāḩeb Dīvān) is a village in Dasht Rural District, in the Central District of Meshgin Shahr County, Ardabil Province, Iran. At the 2006 census, its population was 816, in 163 families.

References 

Tageo

Towns and villages in Meshgin Shahr County